Kleophon may refer to:

 An Athenian politician of the late 5th century BCE
 An Athenian tragic poet of the 4th century BCE
 The so-called "Kleophon Painter", an anonymous Athenian vase painter of the mid-to-late 5th century BCE